Chigirinsky  is an English form or two Russian surnames ( or ). The surnames are related to Ukrainian city Chyhyryn, in Russian Chigirin. Notable people with the surname include: 

Nikolai Chigirinsky (born 1983), Russian serial killer
Shalva Chigirinsky (born 1949), Israeli-Russian businessman

Russian-language surnames